Loni  is a town, near Ghaziabad city in Ghaziabad district in the state of Uttar Pradesh, India and Loni town is governed by Loni Municipal Council which comes under Ghaziabad Metropolitan Region.

History

Loni is listed in the Ain-i-Akbari, an Mughal period document, as a pargana under the Delhi sarkar subdivision, producing a revenue of 3,278,878 dams for the imperial treasury and supplying a force of 200 infantry and 20 cavalry. It had a brick fort at the time.

In the 14th century, an invasion by Timur took place in the town and fort of Loni a few days before the battle against Delhi's Tughlaq Sultan Mahmud Shah. One of Timur's emirs expressed the fear that the men, women and children they were dragging with them would break free and attack from the rear while the army was occupied in battle. Timur's solution was to have a hundred thousand adult Hindu males slaughtered before the battle. He insisted that individual owners would put their own slaves to death rather than outsource the task. Anybody failing to kill would be killed himself.

Geography

Administration

Loni Tehsil
Loni became a new tehsil in Ghaziabad district, within Meerut division, with its headquarters at Roopnagar Industrial Area, about 17 km west of the district headquarters. The tehsil comprises about 49 villages. This will be the basic administrative unit that will allow the people to raise their grievances and get them addressed quickly. Tehsil forms the grassroots administrative setup that takes care of land revenue. The order to this effect was issued by principal secretary, revenue, Kishan Singh Atoria.

Loni Nagar Palika Parisad
The Loni Nagar Palika Parisad was first established on 31 March 1971 as a Nagar Panchayat. Its office is located in Khanna Nagar. According to 2011 census, its population is 516,082. Loni Nagar Palika Parisad is divided into 55 wards. It has total of 36 employees.

Lok Sabha constituency
Loni is within the Ghaziabad (Lok Sabha constituency), whose MP is Vijay Kumar Singh, BJP.

Loni Assembly constituency
As per notification No. 282/UP/2006, Loni became a separate assembly constituency, whose MLA is Nand Kishor Gurjar, BJP.

The Loni assembly constituency includes the following Patwari Circles (PCs):

Demographics
, Loni had a population of 516,082. Males constitute 275,025 (52.8%) of the population and females 241,057 (47.2%). The total number of households in Loni is 89,634. Loni has an average literacy rate of 75.24%, higher than the national average of 74.04%: male literacy is 83.14%, and female literacy is 66.15%. In Loni, around 15% of the population is under six years of age.

Connectivity and transport
Loni can be reached by road, rail, and air. By road, Loni is well-connected to Delhi, NOIDA, Hapur, Modinagar, Bulandshahr, Meerut, Saharanpur, Haridwar, etc.  Many people commute to Delhi, NOIDA, and Greater Noida every day for work. The nearest airport is Hindon Airport, which is located in Ghaziabad.

Road
Loni has a moderate road network connecting to the Delhi-Saharanpur Road, with bus service provided by Uttar Pradesh State Road Transport Corporation (UPSRTC) buses. The bus stand of the UPSRTC is located near Loni crossing (Delhi). Earlier, the Delhi Transport Corporation (DTC) also provided similar bus service but currently such service is not available in Loni. Indira Puri was the location of the DTC bus terminal for Delhi buses, where DTC routes 2 and 263 used to be available. A new bus terminal for private bus operators is near the Advanced Learning Telecom (ALT) training center, Raj Nagar, which is called the ALT Bus Stand. The most common system of transportation is shared autos, which run between Shahdara metro station, Pabi (near Tronica City), Loni, Tiraha, and Indrapuri. Two bus routes go to the Uttar Pradesh (UP) Border, and to the Shahdara and Seelampur metro stations. Loni Depot is a UP bus terminal for UPSRTC Buses, where buses are available to Shamli, Baraut, Baghpat, Saharanpur, Gramin Sewa Rampark Ext., Khajuri Chowk, by Pusta Road, Pavi Tiraha to Khajuri, etc.

Rail
Loni is also connected via railway. Its main stations are the Noli Railway Station (NOLI), Behta Hazipur Halt (BHHZ), Nursratabad Kharkhari (NTG), and Gotra Halt (GTRA). NOLI, which is within the Northern Railway zone of Indian Railways, is close to old Delhi and Ghaziabad railway stations, and connects Loni to Delhi through Shahdara on the Shamli Saharanpur route). NOLI handles over 26 trains and serves about 12,000 passengers every day. There are four intercity trains that start from or pass through NOLI. A warehouse of the Food Corporation of India (FCI) at the station is now used as a container depot.

Delhi Metro
Loni is now connected with Metro services through the Pink Line. The DMRC has a station within Loni, at Shiv Vihar, which is on a  extension of the Yamuna Vihar line to Shiv Vihar, in the third phase of expansion of the Metro network under the Pink Line with Metro feeder bus service. The Shiv Vihar station is serving large part of Loni which was previously dependent on shared auto. Shiv Vihar station is catering to a large number of commuters from Loni, with its population of at least 500,000 people. It is also close to Delhi, just  from the Shahdara and Seelampur Metro stations.

Air
Hindon Airport

With the commencement of operations at the new Terminal 3, Indira Gandhi International Airport has become India's and South Asia's largest aviation hub, with a current capacity of more than 46 million passengers a year.

Loni Gas Pipeline
In 2001, GAIL commissioned the world's longest, and India's first, cross-country LPG transmission pipeline, from Jamnagar to Loni. GAIL's LPG transmission business includes the 1927-km LPG pipeline network that connects the western, northern and southern parts of India. This includes the world's longest exclusively LPG pipeline from Jamnagar, Gujarat, to Teela Loni, near Delhi (another 70 km having been added to this system between Kandla and Samakhiali, in Gujarat, to facilitate the transportation of LPG imported at Kandla port). GAIL's LPG pipelines can transport 3.8 million tonnes per year of LPG, and have the capacity to supply more than 20% of the LPG consumed in the country. There are huge gas distribution terminals in Loni. Indane and Bharat gas are supplying cooking gas from here to north India.

See also
 Baghpat
 Rajkumar Baisla (Wrestler)
 Mahendra Fauji Baisla
 Greater Noida
 Hindon River
 Yamuna
 JagMohan Institute of Management and Technology

References

Cities and towns in Ghaziabad district, India